North Western Province (or North-Western Province) was an electorate of the Victorian Legislative Council (Australia), created in 1856 and was abolished in 2006.

Victoria was a British colony in Australia when North-Western Province was created, it became a state of Australia on Federation on 1 January 1901.

North Western was one of the six original upper house Provinces of the bi-cameral Victorian Parliament created in November 1856, each Province initially having five members.

Located in the far north-west of Victoria, "North-Western Province" was defined in the Victoria Constitution Act 1855, as "Including the Counties of Talbot and Dalhousie, and the Pastoral District of the Wimmera and of the Loddon, except the proposed County of Rodney."

Members for North Western Province
Five members were elected initially, three after the redistribution of 1882 when Northern and North Central provinces were split off. 
Four from the enlargement of the Council in 1889, two from 1904.

Election results

References

Former electoral provinces of Victoria (Australia)
1856 establishments in Australia
2006 disestablishments in Australia